Bosara montana is a moth in the family Geometridae that is endemic to Tahiti.

References

External links

Moths described in 2003
Endemic fauna of Tahiti
Eupitheciini